Astrocaryum aculeatum (known in Brazilian Portuguese as tucumã, acaiúra, acuiuru, coco-tucumã, tucum, tucumã-açu, tucumã-macaw, tucum-açu, tucumaí-da-terra-firme, tucumãí-uaçu, tucumã-piririca, tucumã-purupuru or tucumã-do-mato) is a palm native to tropical South America and Trinidad. It has ascending leaves, erect inflorescence, and yellow fruit.

Etymology
tucumã derives from tuku'mã in the Tupi language.

Taxonomy
Astrocaryum aculeatum was first described by German botanist Georg Friedrich Wilhelm Meyer in 1818 based on a specimen from the Essequibo River in Guyana.

Distribution
Astrocaryum aculeatum is found in and around the Amazon Basin, from Trinidad and Tobago in the north, through Venezuela, Guyana, Suriname, the Brazilian states of Acre, Amazonas, Pará, Rondônia, Roraima and south through the Bolivian departments of Beni, Pando, Santa Cruz.

Uses
This plant has edible fruit which may be used for making a kind of wine. It is also used to make a symbolic ring called a tucum ring.

A fiber is extracted from the leaves for making hammocks and ropes that resist salt water.

Oil

The fruit of tucumã is composed of a woody core almost black in color, containing the white paste of the seed (colloquially called an almond in Brazil) and covered with a yellow-orange pulp. Two types of oils are produced from this fruit: the oil of the external pulp and the almond oil.

The oil extracted from the pulp contains 25.6% saturated fatty acids and 74.4% unsaturated fatty acids composed of palmitic, stearic, oleic, and linoleic acids. It can be used as an emollient. The value of beta-carotene (which is 180 to 330 milligrams/100g oil) is more concentrated in the oil than in the pulp.

Cosmetic industry
The tucuma pulp oil could in the future be used to manufacture soap, body lotions or hair care products.

Physico-chemical data

References

aculeatum
Trees of Brazil
Trees of Trinidad and Tobago
Trees of South America